Phaon was an imperial freedman and confidant of the Roman emperor Nero. He, with Epaphroditus, Neophytus and Sporus, took Nero to his own villa in the suburban area of Rome where the emperor would commit suicide subsequently.

An amphorae stamp was found with the inscription "Phaontis | Aug(usti) l(iberti) a rat(ionibus)", which could mean he was the rationibus of Nero.

It is unclear if he was a freedman of Nero or of Domitia Lepida Minor, whose properties and patronal rights were transferred to Nero after her execution in 54. A "L. Domitius Phaion" is mentioned in an inscription.

In fiction 
Phaon appears in the film Quo Vadis (1951) as an architect of Nero, played by D. A. Clarke-Smith.

Bibliography

References 

1st-century births
1st-century Romans
1st-century deaths
Emperor's slaves and freedmen
Nero